Craveiro is a Portuguese surname meaning "carnation flower" (Dianthus caryophyllus).

Notable people
Notable people with this surname include:
 Francisco Craveiro Lopes (1894–1964), Portuguese politician
 Nuno Craveiro Lopes (1921–1972), Portuguese architect
 Paulo Fernando Craveiro (born 1934), Brazilian writer

References